Dalldorf is a municipality in the district of Lauenburg in Schleswig-Holstein in Germany.

References

Municipalities in Schleswig-Holstein
Herzogtum Lauenburg